The Carlos Palanca Memorial Awards for Literature winners in 1967 (rank, title of winning entry, name of author).


English division
Short story
First prize: “The Fires of the Sun, The Crystalline Sky” by Gregorio Brillantes
Second prize: “Early in Our Lord” by Gilda Cordero-Fernando
Third prize: “Everything” by Tita Lacambra Ayala

Poetry
First prize: “The Tracks of Babylon and Others” by Edith L. Tiempo
Second prize: “Sheaves of Things Burning” by Marra Pl. Lanot
Third prize: “The Exorcism” by Epifanio San Juan Jr.

One-act play
First prize: “And a Happy Birthday” by Nestor Torre Jr.
Second prize: “Voices of Laughter” by Jesus T. Peralta
Third prize: “Apparitions” by Nestor Torre Jr.

Filipino division
Novel
 First prize: "Sa mga Kuko ng Liwanag" by Edgardo M. Reyes

Short story
First prize: “Ang Kamatayan ni Tiyo Samuel” by Efren R. Abueg
Second prize: “Talulot sa Pagas na Lupa” by Domingo Landicho
Third prize: “Masaya ang Alitaptap sa Labi ng Kabibi” by Epifanio San Juan Jr.

Poetry
First prize: “Toreng Bato...Kastilyong Pawid at Bagwis ng Guniguni” by Federico Licsi Espino Jr.
Second prize: “Iba't ibang Tula” by Bienvenido Ramos
Third prize: “O Sanggol na Hari” by Ruben Vega

One-act play
First prize: “Gabi at Araw” by Fernando L. Samonte
Second prize: “Isang Araw ng Paghuhukom” by Benjamin P. Pascual
Third prize: “Isang Kundiman” by Levy Balgos Dela Cruz

References
 

Palanca Awards
1967 literary awards